The Sun Oil Building is a historic building in the Center City area of Philadelphia, Pennsylvania. It served as the headquarters of the Sun Oil Company from its erection in 1928 until Sun relocated in 1971.

It was listed on the National Register of Historic Places in 1983, and on the Philadelphia Register of Historic Places on February 2, 1984.

References

External links 
 The Sun Oil Building at emporis.com
 Listing at Philadelphia Architects and Buildings

Commercial buildings on the National Register of Historic Places in Philadelphia
Office buildings completed in 1928
Art Deco architecture in Pennsylvania
Philadelphia Register of Historic Places
Sunoco LP
Rittenhouse Square, Philadelphia
1928 establishments in Pennsylvania
Skyscraper office buildings in Philadelphia